This is a list of wars involving the Republic of South Sudan.

Footnotes

Bibliography
First Sudanese Civil War:
 Assefa, Hizkias. 1987. Mediation of Civil Wars, Approaches and Strategies – The Sudan Conflict. Boulder, Colorado: Westview Press.
 Eprile, Cecil.  War and Peace in the Sudan, 1955 – 1972.  David and Charles, London. 1974.  .
 Johnson, Douglas H. 1979. "Book Review: The Secret War in the Sudan: 1955–1972 by Edgar O'Ballance". African Affairs 78 (310):132–7.
 O'Ballance, Edgar. 1977. The Secret War in the Sudan: 1955–1972. Hamden, Connecticut: Archon Books. (Faber and Faber edition ).
 Poggo, Scopas Sekwat. 1999. War and Conflict in Southern Sudan, 1955–1972. PhD Dissertation, University of California, Santa Barbara.

External links
Second Sudanese Civil War:
 Background Q & A: The Darfur Crisis, Esther Pan, Council on Foreign Relations, cfr.org
 Price of Peace in Africa: Agreement in Sudan Between Government and Rebel
 Photojournalist's Account – Displacement of Sudan's second civil war
In pictures: Sudan trek – of returning refugees after the war, BBC, 14 June 2005
 With Peace, Sudan Faces Hard Choices, Washington Post, 28 July 2005
 The Nuba Mountains Homepage
 Bishop calls for Churchwide day of prayer and fasting for an end to Sudan violence on 26 June 2011 – leading up to the 9 July expected day of new independence for the Southern Sudan.

 
South Sudan
Wars